Lorenzo Sotomayor Collazo (born 16 February 1985) is a Cuban-born Azerbaijani light-welterweight boxer who won a silver medal at the 2016 Olympics. He is a nephew of the high jumper Javier Sotomayor. In 2013 he moved from Cuba to Azerbaijan to increase his chances for Olympic selection. He chose to compete as Collazo, which means "shining star".

References

External links

 

1985 births
Living people
Azerbaijani male boxers
Olympic boxers of Azerbaijan
Boxers at the 2015 European Games
European Games medalists in boxing
European Games gold medalists for Azerbaijan
Boxers at the 2016 Summer Olympics
Sportspeople from Havana
Naturalized citizens of Azerbaijan
Olympic silver medalists for Azerbaijan
Olympic medalists in boxing
Medalists at the 2016 Summer Olympics
Boxers at the 2019 European Games
European Games bronze medalists for Azerbaijan
Light-welterweight boxers
Cuban emigrants to Azerbaijan
Boxers at the 2020 Summer Olympics